The 2019–20 Burundi Ligue A season, also known as Primus Ligue for sponsorship reasons, was the 57th edition of the Burundi Premier League, the top-tier  football league in Burundi since its establishment in 1963. The season began on 10 August 2019 and was one of the few football leagues still playing during the COVID-19 pandemic, until were suspended after the conclusion of week 27 on 5 April 2020. However, the season resumed on 30 May 2020 and was concluded on 24 June 2020.

Teams 
A total of sixteen clubs participate in this season. Thirteen teams from previous season and three new promoted sides.

Promoted from Ligue B
 BS Dynamik
 Top Junior
 Inter Star

Relegated from Ligue A
 Flambeau de l'Est
 Athlético Olympic
 Le Messager Bujumbura

Other changes
 Top Junior ceded the place in Ligue A to Athlético Olympic, which was renamed as Athlético Academy.

Stadiums and locations

League table

Results

References

Burundi Premier League seasons
Premier League
Premier League
Burundi
Burundi